Ortholepis jugosella is a moth of the family Pyralidae. It was described by Émile Louis Ragonot in 1887. It is found in North America, including Maine, North Carolina and Tennessee.

References

Moths described in 1887
Phycitini